Dmytro Tsymbaliuk (born 19 December 1991 in Zaporizhia) is an amateur Ukrainian Greco-Roman wrestler. He won a bronze medal for his category at the 2016 European Wrestling Championships in Riga.

References

External links
 bio on unitedworldwrestling.org

1991 births
Living people
Sportspeople from Zaporizhzhia
Ukrainian male sport wrestlers
20th-century Ukrainian people
21st-century Ukrainian people